The Gold  Spoon Oration, also called "The Regal Splendor of the President's Palace," was a political speech given in the US House of Representatives by Charles Ogle (Whig-PA) on April 14–16, 1840. The speech reviled then-President Martin Van Buren for his supposedly luxurious lifestyle in the White House, while idealizing Whig presidential candidate William Henry Harrison as a homespun man of the people; compare the idiom "silver spoon".

Shortly after delivering the speech, Ogle had tens of thousands of copies printed and circulated around the nation as campaign literature. Historians, journalists and politicians consider it one of the premier political attacks in American history.  Many also rank it as one of the most amusing speeches ever delivered in Congress. The speech is almost coincidentally the most complete inventory of the objects and furnishings of the White House for that time.

It was claimed by the Trenton Emporium that what was published was not the speech made by Ogle.  The paper claimed that the published speech was edited multiple times and stuffed with fabrications developed by other Whig Party members.

Description
Ogle took the floor of the House of Representatives on April 14, 1840. For the better part of three days he addressed the House, sitting as a committee of the whole, about the "regal splendor of the President's Palace." His words over those three days would snowball into a political campaign like no other.

In the presidential campaign of 1840, Democrat Martin Van Buren, eighth president of the United States, met strong Whig opposition to his supposedly "royal lifestyle." Van Buren continued to entertain European dignitaries in an elegant manner after the collapse of the economy in 1837. Van Buren's rather dandyish style and refined tastes did make an easy target for Whig attacks. Presidential scholars have pointed out that, while Van Buren did enjoy the latest fashions from Manhattan, he purchased such personal items with money from his own pocket and spent little public money on the White House. Van Buren did make needed repairs and refurbishments as well as redecorations to the presidential residence.

Ogle announced that $88,722.58 had been appropriated by Congress for the White House since the Democrats had taken control of the presidency (though only $11,806.22 was appropriated during Van Buren's term). By the second day of his speech the galleries were packed to capacity. Laughter and sarcastic comments from the floor and the galleries were common during the speech. The disruptions continued after Ogle left the floor and several other members, many of them Whigs like him, took the floor to defend the president and apologize for Ogle's behavior. However, the speech proved effective in defining Van Buren as an out-of-touch aristocrat, and Harrison was elected to the presidency in November, 1840 — only to die in office a month after his inauguration.

Excerpts from the speech

References

Sources

See also
Great Male Renunciation

External links
White House Historical Association essay on the Gold Spoon Oration, by William Seale
Discussion of the Gold Spoon Oration in The President's House, by Margaret Truman
"Hurrah and Hokum" Whistlestop podcast, by John Dickerson
American Heritage magazine discussion of the Gold Spoon Oration

1840 United States presidential election
April 1840 events
Presidency of Martin Van Buren
1840 in Washington, D.C.
1840 speeches